Bhagwant Singh Mann (Also known as "Comedy King" and "Jugnu", born 17 October 1973) is an Indian politician and former actor, comedian and satirist serving as the 17th & Current Chief Minister of Punjab since 2022. He represents the Dhuri constituency in Punjab Legislative Assembly since 2022 from Aam Aadmi Party and the convener of Aam Aadmi Party, Punjab since 2019. Mann also served as the member of Lok Sabha from Sangrur from 2014 till he resigns in 2022.He is former member of People's Party of Punjab from 2012 to 2014.

Early life
Mann was born in a Sikh family on 17 October 1973 to father Mohinder Singh and mother Harpal Kaur in Satoj village of Sunam tehsil of Sangrur district, Punjab, India. He completed his first year of a Bachelor of Commerce course at Shaheed Udham Singh Government College, Sunam.

Acting career
Mann participated in youth comedy festivals and inter-college competitions. He won two gold medals at a competition at the Punjabi University, Patiala for the Shaheed Udham Singh Government College, Sunam.

Mann developed comedy routines about typical Indian issues such as politics, business and sport. His first comedy album was with comedian Jagtar Jaggi. Together, they made a television program called Jugnu Kehnda Hai for Alpha ETC Punjabi. Ten years later, they parted ways. Mann then formed a comedy partnership with Rana Ranbir. Together, they made the television program, Jugnu Mast Mast for Alpha ETC Punjabi. In 2006, Mann and Jaggi reunited and toured Canada and England with their show, No Life With Wife.

In 2008, Mann competed in the Great Indian Laughter Challenge on Star Plus which increased his audience.

Bhagwant Mann also acted in National Award winning Film "Main Maa Punjab Dee" Directed by Balwant Dullat.

Mann acted in Jugnu Hazir Hai on MH One.

Political career
In early 2011, Mann joined the People's Party of Punjab. In 2012, he unsuccessfully contested assembly elections in the Lehra constituency.

In March 2014, Mann joined the Aam Aadmi Party to contest elections in the Sangrur Lok Sabha constituency. He fought his first Lok Sabha election against former union minister Sukhdev Singh Dhindsa and won by 211,721 votes.

Convener of AAP Punjab
In 2017, Mann was appointed the convener of AAP Punjab. In 2018 he resigned from the convener post after Arvind Kejriwal tendered an unconditional apology to Bikram Singh Majithia over Kejriwal's allegations about Majithia's involvement in the drug mafia case. He contested the 2017 Punjab Legislative Assembly election, from Jalalabad against Sukhbir Singh Badal and Ravneet Singh Bittu. He lost the elections to Badal by 18,500 votes.

In January 2019, Mann was appointed the convener of AAP Punjab for a second time. His political rivals had in past criticized him over alcohol use. Mann has denied these allegations. In 2019, during a party rally in Barnala, Mann announced that he had denounced alcohol and swore never to touch it again.

In June 2021, MLA and deputy leader of the opposition in Punjab assembly, Saravjit Kaur Manuke held a hunger strike along with AAP activists to protest against the inaction of the Punjab government in the payment of post-matric scholarship amount of Dalit students. Mann said that the protest by AAP members had forced the Punjab government then led by CM Amarinder Singh to release the funds amounting to 200 crores as a 40% share of the amount that the Punjab government had to pay.

Member of Parliament

First term (2014–2019)
In May 2014, he was elected to the 16th Lok Sabha from Sangrur Lok Sabha constituency after defeating Sukhdev Singh Dhindsa from Shiromani Akali Dal. He got 533,237 total votes and won election with a margin of 211,721 votes.

Parliamentary Committee assignments
 1 September 2014 – 25 May 2019: Member,  Standing Committee on Personnel, Public Grievances, Law and Justice.
Member of the Consultative Committee, Ministry of Rural Development, Panchayati Raj and Drinking Water and Sanitation
 11 December 2014 – 25 May 2019 : Member, Joint Committee on Offices of Profit

Second term (2019–2022)
In May 2019, he was re-elected to 17th Lok Sabha from Sangrur constituency in the 2019 Indian general election. He won his second term in the Parliament with a margin of 110,211 votes. He got 413,561 votes while contesting against Kewal Singh Dhillon from Indian National Congress and Parminder Singh Dhindsa from Shiromani Akali Dal. He is only Member of parliament from Aam Aadmi Party in the lower house (Lok Sabha) of the parliament.

On 18 January 2022, he was chosen as the Chief Minister of Punjab candidate from the Aam Aadmi Party for the 2022 Punjab Legislative Assembly election. The selection was reportedly done by polling from the public and the results were declared by the party chief Arvind Kejriwal.

On 9 February, Mann raised issues about farmers in the Lok Sabha. The payment to sugarcane farmers for the year 2020-21 and 2021-22 had been pending. He appealed for clearing the due early along with interest.  He asked for compensation for the losses in cotton farmers due to the pest attack. he asked that the Union government should recognize the farmers who died during the 2020–2021 Indian farmers' protest.

 Parliamentary Committee assignments
 13 September 2019 onwards: Member, Standing Committee on Food, Consumer Affairs and Public Distribution
 Member, Consultative Committee, Committee on External Affairs

In 2021, the Parliamentary Committee on Food, Consumer Affairs and Public Distribution submitted a report to the Union Government recommending the implementation of the Essential Commodities Act, 2020. The Essential Commodities Act, 2020 was one among the three controversial 2020 Indian agriculture acts that led to the year-long 2020–2021 Indian farmers' protest. Mann publicly released his statement that was made during the Committee meeting on 5 June 2020. In his statement, Mann had raised concerns that these farm laws would increase hoarding. Removal of onions and tomatoes from the list of Essential Commodities would lead to price rise due to illegal stockpiling to increase the price and then selling at higher prices. This will create hardships for the poor. He also raised the issue of hoarding potatoes.

Mann contested the 2022 Punjab Assembly elections and won. AAP won a large majority of 92 out of total 117 seats. Mann was designated as the CM. Two days before taking the oath as CM of Punjab, Mann resigned from his post of MP Sangrur on 14 March 2022.

Chief Minister of Punjab 

On 18 January 2022, Mann was chosen as the Aam Aadmi Party (AAP) candidate for the Chief Minister of Punjab in the 2022 Punjab Legislative Assembly election, based on the party's public poll that overwhelmingly weighed in his favour.

On 10 March, the election results showed Mann as the winner from Dhuri Assembly constituency with a significant difference of 58,206 votes, and the next day he was elected as the leader of the AAP legislative party. The party itself went on to win 92 seats out of 117 in the state's assembly elections. Mann took oath as the 17th Chief Minister of Punjab on 16 March 2022 at Khatkar Kalan, the ancestral village of freedom fighter Bhagat Singh.

Ending VIP culture 
Even before taking the oath, CM designate Mann took steps to end the VIP culture and met the Director General of Police. The next day the police DGP in charge of security ordered the withdrawal of police security from 122 former MLAs and ministers. A total of 384 policemen involved in the security of those politicians were transferred to their parent unit. Mann had stated that the police force was needed for the security of the people and not VIPs. The security of former chief ministers was continued as they had been provided security on the instructions of the Union Home Ministry. AAP convener Arvind Kejriwal said Mann had "removed the security of old ministers and gave security to the public".

Employment
On 19 March 2022, during the first Cabinet meeting, Mann announced his decision to fill 25,000 job openings in various departments of Punjab government. 10,000 of those vacancies were in the Punjab Police.

On 22 March, he announced his decision to make the 35,000 employees in the state working on a temporary, contractual basis permanent government employees. He will bring a bill to the assembly to this effect. Announcing his decision he said, "I don't want these teachers protesting on the roads, I had promised to regularize their services if we are voted to power and I am fulfilling my promise."

On 5 September, Teachers' Day in 2022, he announced that payment of teachers from government institutions in Punjab will be according to UGC’s Seventh Pay Commission from 1 October 2022.

Education
On 30 March 2022, Mann ordered that private schools cannot hike their school fees in the year 2022. He also ordered that no school can force the parents to make school-related purchases from exclusive stores. This was done to protect the consumers from imposed monopoly. On 5 September 2022, he announced bus services for girl students in Punjab government schools.

Agriculture

Transportation
In June 2022, Mann announced Volvo bus service between IGI Airport and different Punjab cities of the state. The tariff charged by the PRTC and PEPSU buses for the Airport were announced at half the rates being charged by the private bus operators. Mann said that this service would break the monopoly of a few families in bus business with political links.

Electricity 
Fulfilling their election promise of providing free electricity, from 1 July the people in Punjab would get 300 units of free electricity. 73.39 lakh domestic consumers were estimated to benefit from the scheme.

Health 
On 15 August 2022, 75 Aam Aadmi Clinics were made functional.

Language and Culture 
On 19 November 2022, while giving a speech at Guru Nanak Dev University to commemorate Punjabi Language Month, Mann announced a government policy to require all public signboards to prominently feature Punjabi over other languages. He encouraged citizens to change their signs before 21 February 2023, after which the government will begin enforcing the rule. He also exhorted educational institutions to begin adding specialized Punjabi language courses, citing his perceived decline in the proper use of Punjabi pronunciation and grammatical rules.

Electoral performance

Parliament: Lok Sabha

Punjab Assembly

Philanthropy
Mann began a non-government organization, the "Lok Lehar Foundation", to aid children with physical deformities as a result of groundwater pollution in the border areas of Punjab.

Personal life 
He is a comic poet who writes political satire. He is also a volleyball player. He was married to Inderpreet Kaur until their divorce in 2015. They have a son and a daughter.

On 7 July 2022, Mann married Gurpreet Kaur. She is a doctor by profession.

Discography

Comedy

Musical

Filmography

Videography

References

External links
Biographical Sketch of Lok Sabha member

Punjabi people
Lok Sabha members from Punjab, India
1973 births
Living people
India MPs 2019–present
People from Sangrur district
Indian comedians
Indian actor-politicians
Punjab, India MLAs 2022–2027
Mann ministry
Bhagwant Mann
Chief ministers from Aam Aadmi Party
Aam Aadmi Party politicians from Punjab, India
Home Ministers of Punjab, India
Male actors from Punjab, India
Aam Aadmi Party candidates in the 2017 Punjab Legislative Assembly election
Indian Sikhs